Thelma Elizabeth Hopkins (born 16 March 1936) is a Northern Irish athlete, who competed in the high and the long jump.

On 5 May 1956 she broke the world record in high jump in Belfast with a jump of 1.74 metres, breaking the record of 1.73 metres set by Aleksandra Chudina of the USSR on 22 May 1954. Her record was broken on 14 July 1956 in Bucharest by Iolanda Balaș of Romania.

Her achievement in breaking the world record is commemorated by a plaque in Cherryvale Playing Fields, South Belfast.
 
Hopkins was born in Kingston upon Hull. She competed for Great Britain in the 1956 Summer Olympics held in Melbourne, Australia, in the high jump event, where she won the silver medal jointly with Maria Pisareva. In the 1954 Commonwealth Games she won a gold medal for Northern Ireland.
As well as athletics she excelled at hockey where she was a regular choice for the Ireland women's national field hockey team, playing at forward and winning 40 caps. She also represented Ireland as an international Squash player.

She was one of many signatories in a letter to The Times on 17 July 1958 opposing 'the policy of apartheid' in international sport and defending 'the principle of racial equality which is embodied in the Declaration of the Olympic Games'.

References

 Brown, Geoff and Hogsbjerg, Christian. Apartheid is not a Game: Remembering the Stop the Seventy Tour campaign. London: Redwords, 2020. .

1936 births
Living people
Sportspeople from Kingston upon Hull
Female high jumpers from Northern Ireland
Olympic athletes of Great Britain
Olympic silver medallists for Great Britain
Athletes (track and field) at the 1952 Summer Olympics
Athletes (track and field) at the 1956 Summer Olympics
Medalists at the 1956 Summer Olympics
Commonwealth Games gold medallists for Northern Ireland
Commonwealth Games medallists in athletics
Athletes (track and field) at the 1954 British Empire and Commonwealth Games
Athletes (track and field) at the 1958 British Empire and Commonwealth Games
Athletes (track and field) at the 1962 British Empire and Commonwealth Games
European Athletics Championships medalists
Olympic silver medalists in athletics (track and field)
Universiade medalists in athletics (track and field)
Ireland international women's field hockey players
Female field hockey players from Northern Ireland
Irish female field hockey players
British female field hockey players
Irish female squash players
Universiade bronze medalists for Great Britain
Medalists at the 1961 Summer Universiade
Medallists at the 1954 British Empire and Commonwealth Games